Elihu Colman (May 11, 1841January 25, 1899) was an American lawyer and Republican politician.  He was a member of the Wisconsin State Assembly, representing Fond du Lac County during the 1872 session.  He later served as United States Attorney for the Eastern District of Wisconsin in 1890 under U.S. President Benjamin Harrison.

Biography

Born in Oneida, Wisconsin, his father was Henry R. Colman, who was a Methodist minister and missionary among the Oneida Tribe. In 1847, Colman and his family moved to Fond du Lac, Wisconsin. He served in the 1st Wisconsin Cavalry Regiment of the Union Army during the American Civil War, achieving the rank of quartermaster sergeant. Colman graduated from Lawrence University in 1865. He then studied law and was admitted to the Wisconsin bar. In 1873, Colman served in the Wisconsin State Assembly.

In 1880, he was the Republican nominee for Wisconsin's 5th congressional district, receiving 14,753 votes to 16,984 for Democratic incumbent Edward S. Bragg and 1,188 for Greenbacker John E. Thomas. Colman was appointed United States Attorney for the United States District Court for the Eastern District of Wisconsin in 1890 by President Benjamin Harrison. He died unexpectedly in Green Bay, Wisconsin.

References

1841 births
1899 deaths
People from Oneida, Wisconsin
Politicians from Fond du Lac, Wisconsin
People of Wisconsin in the American Civil War
Union Army soldiers
Lawrence University alumni
Members of the Wisconsin State Assembly
United States Attorneys for the Eastern District of Wisconsin
19th-century American politicians